Anton "Toni" Schumacher (born 1 December 1938 in Bonn) is a German former professional football goalkeeper.

Career
Schumacher played for 1. FC Köln since 1950, from 1963 to 1968 the team played in the Bundesliga. In 1964, he won the German Championship.

Personal
The goalkeeper Harald Schumacher who played for 1. FC Köln from 1972 to 1987 was also nicknamed "Toni" by the players of the team, to avoid misunderstandings between him and the defender Harald Konopka.

References

External links

1938 births
Living people
German footballers
Association football goalkeepers
FC Viktoria Köln players
Bundesliga players
1. FC Köln players
Sportspeople from Bonn
Footballers from North Rhine-Westphalia